Mahanati is a 2018 Indian Telugu-language biographical drama film based on the life of actress Savitri. It is written and directed by Nag Ashwin, and produced by Priyanka Dutt under Vyjayanthi Movies and Swapna Cinema. The film features Keerthy Suresh as Savitri while Dulquer Salmaan (in his Telugu debut) plays Savitri's husband Gemini Ganesan. The film also stars Samantha Akkineni and Vijay Deverakonda, along with Rajendra Prasad, Prakash Raj, and Bhanupriya who appear in supporting roles. Naga Chaitanya and Mohan Babu, among others, play guest appearances. The plot follows Savitri's life, depicting her turbulent rise to prominence, marriage with Ganesan, and subsequent fall from grace, which is viewed from the perspective of a journalist and a photographer, played by Samantha and Deverakonda respectively.

Ashwin began working on the biopic of Savitri following the release of his directorial debut Yevade Subramanyam (2015). Its principal photography began in May 2017 and ended in March 2018 with filming taking place in Hyderabad, Palakollu, Bangalore, Chennai, Mysore, and Delhi. Dani Sanchez-Lopez performed the cinematography while Kotagiri Venkateswara Rao edited the film. The film features the score and soundtrack composed by Mickey J. Meyer. Mahanati is released theatrically on 9 May 2018 while its dubbed versions in Tamil released on 11 May 2018, with the title Nadigaiyar Thilagam and in Malayalam on the same day as Mahanadi

Mahanati received critical acclaim for Keerthy's performance and Ashwin's screenplay and direction. Budgeted at crore, the film grossed crore worldwide and became the highest-grossing female-centric South Indian film. The film won three awards at the 66th National Film Awards, namely, Best Feature Film in Telugu, Best Actress for Keerthy and Best Costume Design. The film also won four Filmfare Awards South including Best Film and Best Actress in Telugu category. Mahanati was screened at the International Film Festival of India, the Shanghai International Film Festival, and the Indian Film Festival of Melbourne.

Plot  
In 1980, Bangalore, a popular yesteryear actress Nissankara Savitri is found unconscious by her son. She is hospitalized, spending a year in a coma. The incident receives media attention but Savitri's initial life and whereabouts remain unknown to the public. Madhuravani, a stuttering journalist, and Vijay Anthony, a photographer, are appointed to write an article about her situation. Madhuravani recovers a letter written by Savitri, in which she wishes to take her son to someone called "Shankarayya." Though she is later relieved from writing the memoir by her editor, Madhuravani continues her research curiously. She sneaks into Savitri's house and overhears her aunt talking about her childhood.

In 1942, Vijayawada, a widowed Subadrama and her daughter Nissankara Savitri are taken in by Subadrama's sister, Durgamba, and her husband, K.V. Chowdhary, much to the latter's chagrin. Savitri grows up to become an accomplished dancer and earns a profit for Chowdhary by acting in plays with her friend Susheela. The increasing popularity of cinema leads to less attendance for plays, and Chowdhary incurs huge losses. He tries to have Savitri join the film industry based in Madras but her young age and inability to speak Tamil hinder her prospects. She, however, meets Ramasamy "Gemini" Ganesan, a studio employee who takes her photograph for a casting director. A year later, Savitri is cast in a film directed by L. V. Prasad but she gets the dialogue wrong and is thrown out. However, she earns a dancing role for a song in the film Pathala Bhairavi. Her performance in that film helps her in getting major roles.

Savitri is offered a role opposite Ganesan, now an actor, who teaches her Tamil language. They together rise as superstars and Savitri falls in love with the married Ganesan. They secretly marry at a temple, which leads to a clash with Savitri's family. Despite being reluctant to act after marriage, Savitri is persuaded by the filmmakers and Ganesan. She goes on to become a successful actress. Savitri later gives birth to two children a girl, Vijaya Chamundeshwari and a boy. Ganesan is initially supportive of her career, however, he feels jealous of Savitri as her fame overshadows his. He starts consuming alcohol and when Savitri tries to stop him, he shares the drink with her.

A few ladies urge Savitri to both direct and star in an all-woman cast and crew film. On the day of her film's release, Savitri finds Ganesan in their guesthouse with another woman. Feeling cheated, Savitri angrily parts ways with Ganesan. She becomes an alcoholic and gains weight. Meanwhile, her mother dies, and poor financial decisions lead to a raid by the Income Tax Department, resulting in the loss of her wealth. One day, Savitri fights with Vijaya about her excessive alcohol consumption and faints, accidentally setting their house on fire. They learn that Savitri has diabetes.

As Chowdhary visits Savitri, she asks both Vijaya and Chowdhary for forgiveness. She gets Vijaya married, stops drinking, and loses weight. She shifts to a smaller house with her son and starts acting in low-budget films. She sets aside money for opening a rehabilitation center. Upon knowing that she still owes income tax, she strongly refuses to part with any more money. She goes to Bangalore with her son the next day. Feeling lost, she calls Ganesan but cuts the line before speaking. Angry with him and with herself, she consumes alcohol again, before collapsing into a coma.

Madhuravani realizes her love for Anthony via Savitri's story. She interrupts what is supposedly Anthony's engagement and speaks strongly without a stutter, only to realize that is his sister's engagement and that Anthony too loves her. Madhuravani writes Savitri's memoir and visits the comatose Savitri. She places a picture of her father retrieved from a newspaper archive in her hands. Savitri dies in December 1981.

In the end, Shankarayya is revealed to be a statue that Savitri considers her father.

Cast 

Actor N. T. Rama Rao is featured in a cameo appearance as himself using archive footage. A body-double also played the role of N. T. Rama Rao.

Production

Development 
In May 2016, director Nag Ashwin, who made his debut with Yevade Subramanyam (2015), announced that his next film would be a biopic of the Indian actress Savitri, who was active during the 1950s and 60s, predominantly in Telugu and Tamil films. The film was titled Mahanati, and Ashwin had finished the script work and began casting actors for the project. He spent six months researching the actress by reading articles and books, in addition to meeting old journalists and actors associated with her. In an interview with Indo-Asian News Service, Ashwin talked about his intention to adapt Savitri's life into a film. "From a penniless origin to the first female superstar, her life is quite a story," he stated. Ashwin felt that the time had come to revisit the "legends" and understand why they were legends." In another interview to India Today, Ashwin told that choosing to make Mahanati was more of a subconscious decision, as he grew up watching her films and songs.

The film's production is handled by Ashwin's wife Priyanka Dutt and her sister Swapna Dutt. They are the daughters of veteran film producer Ashwini Dutt, the founder of Vyjayanthi Movies. The film was originally intended to be shot simultaneously in Telugu and Tamil languages, however, the Tamil version was later dropped in favour of a dub.

Cast and crew 
In August 2016, Ashwin announced his intention to cast the lead actress with an audience poll. In December, Nithya Menen entered the talks to play Savitri but it did not materialise. Subsequently, Keerthy Suresh was signed for the role in early January 2017. Though Ashwin had a few other options in his mind, he was convinced that Keerthy was the right choice after watching her in Thodari (2016). Keerthy was initially apprehensive to play Savitri but her mother, who is a fan of Savitri's work prompted her to take up the role. While preparing for the character, she watched Savitri's films, read her biography A Legendary Actress: Mahanati Savitri, and consulted her daughter Vijaya Chamundeswari to know about her personality.

Samantha Akkineni was confirmed to be a part of the project who would be portraying Madhuravani, a journalist from whose perspective the story is narrated. For the role of Savitri's husband Gemini Ganesan, Ashwin has considered Suriya and Madhavan, before finalising Dulquer Salmaan for the character. The film marked Salmaan's debut in Telugu cinema. Vijay Deverakonda, who had earlier been considered for Ganesan's role, was selected to pair opposite Samantha as Vijay Antony. Ashwin told Indo-Asian News Service that Salmaan's portrayal of Ganesan would go beyond the physical resemblance, to better depict the character's emotional side.

The cast also includes Rajendra Prasad who plays Savitri's uncle KV Chowdary and Bhanupriya who plays Savitri's aunt. Shalini Pandey plays Suseela, Savitri's friend. Naga Chaitanya plays his grandfather Akkineni Nageswara Rao while Mohan Babu plays S. V. Ranga Rao. Other appearances include Prakash Raj as Aluri Chakrapani, Krish as K. V. Reddy, and Srinivas Avasarala as L. V. Prasad among others. Sai Madhav Burra who gave the dialogue for the film, makes a cameo appearance as writer Pingali. N. T. Rama Rao Jr. was offered to play his grandfather N. T. Rama Rao but he politely declined it saying that he would not be able to do justice for that role.

Mickey J Meyer and Dani Sanchez-Lopez were confirmed as music composer and cinematographer respectively.

Filming 

Principal photography began on 29 May 2017 in Hyderabad and ended on 22 March 2018. Filming also took place in Palakollu of West Godavari district to picturise Savitri's childhood, in addition to Bangalore, Chennai, Mysore, and Delhi. The song "Aha Na Peliyanta" from Mayabazar (1957) was shot as a part of the first schedule and a 25-day long second schedule took place in June. Singeetam Srinivasa Rao who worked as an assistant director for Mayabazar visited the sets when they were shooting scenes related to that film. Keethy gained some weight to play crucial scenes featuring Savitri after her childbirth.

Madhuravani's storyline which takes place in the 1980s was shot on film stock, using a super 16mm camera to achieve a grainy texture. Cinematographer Sanchez-Lopez explained that the decision was consciously made to match the Technicolor format used in the Indian films of that period. Salmaan shot his portions by January 2018. He completed his dubbing later in March, followed by Akkineni and Keerthy in April.

The production team is said to have put extensive effort into Savitri's costumes and jewellery. To give a vintage look for the jewellery, designer Naveen Sangli used old methods such as gold wire wrapping and dainty stone setting. Sangli worked with Ashwin and the costume designer Gaurang Shah to get the right match between the saris and jewellery. Shah revealed that they did months of research for costumes. He along with a team of 100 artisans worked over a year to make them.

Music 

The film's score and soundtrack album are composed by Mickey J. Meyer. The album consists of five songs with lyrics written by Sirivennela Sitaramasastri and Ramajogayya Sastry. Aditya Music acquired the film's audio rights. The full album of Mahanati was released on 1 May 2018 at a launch event, featuring the entire cast and crew. A sixth single "Gelupuleni Samaram" that was not part of the album was released later. Mridula Ramagudu of Firstpost called the album Meyer's best work to date.

Themes and influences 
The film's structure broadly follows that of Orson Welles' Citizen Kane (1941), where a reporter sets out to find the story of an elderly protagonist. The mystery of 'Rosebud' in Citizen Kane is comparable to 'Shankarayya' in Mahanati. While the film is based on Savitri's life, Madhuravani, the journalist played by Akkineni, is fictional. It is reported that the character was inspired by Sivasankari, a journalist and writer of Ananda Vikatan magazine who published an article about Savitri's ill-health and financial position similar to Madhuravani. Madhuravani is named after Savitri's character in Kanyasulkam (1955). Cinema Express' Aditya Shrikrishna noted that the inter-religious romance between Madhuravani and Antony is similar to the one depicted in the Savitri-starrer Missamma (1955). The scene in which Ganesan takes Savithri's hand on her terrace while her fans below are watching for her is an ode to Mani Ratnam's Iruvar (1997).

In an interview with The Hindu, Sanchez-Lopez talked about the choice of colour palettes in the film. The colours represent the tone and mood of the film as it explores Savitri's life. The use of mirrors in the film also serves as visual metaphors to her life.

Shrikrishna of Cinema Express stated that the film is not just a biopic but a "visual retelling of the history of South Indian cinema", adding, "Ashwin, in crafting this love letter to Savithri, encloses a post-script to cinema of a bygone era and the people at the centre of that early movement." The film also touches upon the movement for the statehood of Andhra Pradesh which took place in that period.

Release 
Mahanati was initially slated to release worldwide on 29 March 2018. Owing to delays in post-production and CG work, it was postponed to May. The film was released on 9 May 2018, while its dubbed versions in Tamil and Malayalam languages were released on 11 May 2018, the former titled Nadigaiyar Thilagam ( The pride of actresses).

The overseas distribution rights of Mahanati were acquired by Nirvana Cinemas, reportedly at an amount of million. N. Chandrababu Naidu, the then chief minister of Andhra Pradesh, was impressed with the film and offered to exempt Mahanati from taxes in Andhra Pradesh, but the studio owner Ashwini Dutt politely declined it. Mahanati was pirated on torrent websites which affected its box office collections. This was partly due to the unavailability of screens due to holdovers of the year's previous releases Bharat Ane Nenu, Rangasthalam, and Naa Peru Surya, Naa Illu India. The number of screens were increased in the second week. From the third week, makers announced that the film would be screened at the old age homes.

After the film's release, Ganesan's first daughter Kamala Selvaraj alleged that Ganesan's characterisation was distorted and the film was biased in favour of Savitri. Ashwin responded by stating that Selvaraj was made aware of the plot during its development. Savitri's daughter Vijaya Chamundeswari also defended the film, suggesting that Selvaraj may have watched the film from a different perspective.

Home media 
The film's digital rights were acquired by Amazon Prime Video. The television broadcast rights of Mahanati were acquired by Star Maa; its premiere on television registered a target rating point (TRP) rating of 20.16. A deleted scene from the Tamil version of the film was released on 30 May 2018. The scene recreated the song "Vaarayo Vennilave" from Missiamma (1955). The film was also dubbed in Hindi and released by Goldmines Telefilms on YouTube on 14 October 2021.

Reception

Box office 
Mahanati became the highest-grossing South Indian film that starred a woman as the primary character, surpassing Anushka Shetty's Rudramadevi (2015). The film was made on a budget of crore and grossed crore by the end of its theatrical run. The film is a profitable venture and International Business Times reported that it earned over 50% profit to its distributors.

It had a bigger opening in the US than its home territory of Andhra Pradesh and Telangana, where it fared low due to the release of other big productions. In its first weekend, the film collected crore worldwide in both Telugu and Tamil versions, and grossed crore in the first week. In two weeks, the film grossed approximately crore. It completed its 50-day theatrical run with a gross of crore. With over million (₹17.4 crore), Mahanati stood as the sixth-highest grossing Telugu film in the United States.

Critical reception 

Mahanati garnered widespread critical acclaim upon release. Critics praised Keerthy's performance and Ashwin's screenplay and direction. The film's picturisation, music, and art direction were also appreciated. Writing for The Times of India, Neeshita Nyayapati gave the film four stars out of five and commented, "To call Mahanati a celebration of Savitri's life would be an understatement, because the film breathes her life in a span of almost 3 hours." A review carried by Sify opined that Ashwin narrated the story in an emotional and poignant manner. They found Keerthy's portrayal of Savitri "pitch perfect" and felt Salmaan gave his "best performance." Sub-editor of India Today, Janani K called Mahanati "one of the best biopics of all time."

The Indian Express critic Manoj Kumar R gave the film four stars out of five and praised the performances. He called Salmaan, Keerthy, Akkineni, and the costume designers as the four best things to happen to the film. "These three actors are in top form and equally shoulder this film," Kumar stated. Priyanka Sundar of Hindustan Times applauded Salmaan's performance and wrote, "whether it is a frustrated and rude Ganesan when Savitri succumbs to coma or his cheesy Romeo avatar wooing Savitri [...] Dulquer has nailed it." Sangeetha Devi Dundoo of The Hindu said that the film belonged to Keerthy and Salmaan. "[T]hey imbibe the mannerisms of the legendary actors they're portraying but don't end up as caricatures," she wrote.

Suresh Kavirayani of Deccan Chronicle gave a positive review and praised the aspects of production and writing. He wrote: "The director has also successfully captured the essence of Gemini Ganeshan and Savitri's romance. He takes the audience on an emotional journey along with the actress." Krishna Sripada of The News Minute felt that Ashwin had pulled off a stunner by making Savitri's story a "once-in-a-lifetime epic." He said that the film would make the audience "smile through the tears". A review from The Free Press Journal gave 4 stars stated the performances are "compelling." "Director Nag Ashwin demonstrates a surprising level of maturity in apportioning flamboyance to the real-life tale," the reviewer wrote. Rahul Devalapalli of The Week observed that Keerthy shared a striking resemblance with Savitri. "In some of the scenes, shot in black and white, it is tough to tell if it is Savitri or Keerthy," Devulapalli added.

In his review for Firstpost, Hemnath Kumar gave Mahanati three stars out of five; he felt that the film does not have enough drama and wrote, "It is like reading a Wikipedia page of a famous person. You might get all that you are looking for but it is not the same as reading an in-depth book about the same person". Mathrubhumi'''s Akshara K. V. who also gave the film three stars out of five opined that the film's runtime could have been shorter as the latter half of the film lagged. Writing for Film Companion, Baradwaj Rangan said, "Mahanati, despite its numerous failings, cannot be easily dismissed – because it remembers a forgotten era, whose clips are lovingly recreated via scratchy prints and computerised colour". Among the overseas reviewers, Mythily Ramachandran in her review for Gulf News wrote that "Suresh completely owns her character and delivers a powerful performance. Dulquer Salmaan as Gemini Ganesan plays the perfect tango. Samantha, Vijay Devarkonda and Rajendra Prasad in supporting roles are brilliant." She also appreciated Meyer's "melodious compositions" and Sanchez-Lopez's frames that "juggle between sepia tones and colour."

 Legacy 
The first look poster that featured Keerthy as Savitri was parodied in the promotional poster of Tamizh Padam 2 (2018). In August 2018, an art series titled The Mahanati Retrospective was showcased at the Telugu Film Chamber, Hyderabad. It was as a tribute to the actress Savitri which portrayed her in various phases of her life. Mahanati's success spurred a series of biopics in the Telugu film industry. These include Yatra, NTR film series (Kathanayakudu and Mahanayakudu), and Lakshmi's NTR, which released in 2019.

 Accolades 

At the 66th National Film Awards, Mahanati won three awards, Best Feature Film in Telugu, Best Actress (Keerthy) and Best Costume Design (Rajshree Patnaik, Gaurang Shah and Archana Rao). The film won four Filmfare Awards South (including Best Film – Telugu and Best Actress – Telugu), three South Indian International Movie Awards (including Best Film – Telugu and Best Actress – Telugu), and ten awards at Zee Cine Awards Telugu, among others.

The film has also garnered the Equality in Cinema award at the 2018 Indian Film Festival of Melbourne. Mahanati'' was selected in the Indian Panorama section at the 49th International Film Festival of India and was also screened at the Shanghai International Film Festival.

Notes

References

External links 
 

2018 films
Films about actors
Indian biographical films
Best Telugu Feature Film National Film Award winners
2010s Telugu-language films
Indian films based on actual events
Films scored by Mickey J Meyer
Films set in the 1950s
Films set in the 1960s
Films set in the 1970s
Films set in the 1980s
Films set in Chennai
Films featuring a Best Actress National Award-winning performance
Films that won the Best Costume Design National Film Award
Cultural depictions of actors
2010s biographical films
Films set in Andhra Pradesh
Films set in Vijayawada
Films set in Bangalore
2018 drama films
Films shot in Andhra Pradesh
Biographical films about singers
Films directed by Nag Ashwin